Rangbaaz may refer to:

 Rangbaaz (2013 film), an Indian Bengali language film
 Rangbaz (1973 film), a Bangladeshi film
 Rangbaz (2017 film), a Bangladeshi gangster film
 Rangbaaz (web series), a 2018 web series